Roy Claxton Acuff (September 15, 1903 – November 23, 1992) was an American country music singer, fiddler, and promoter. Known as the "King of Country Music", Acuff is often credited with moving the genre from its early string band and "hoedown" format to the singer-based format that helped make it internationally successful. In 1952, Hank Williams told Ralph Gleason, "He's the biggest singer this music ever knew. You booked him and you didn't worry about crowds. For drawing power in the South, it was Roy Acuff, then God."

Acuff began his music career in the 1930s and gained regional fame as the singer and fiddler for his group, the Smoky Mountain Boys. He joined the Grand Ole Opry in 1938, and although his popularity as a musician waned in the late 1940s, he remained one of the Opry's key figures and promoters for nearly four decades. In 1942, Acuff and Fred Rose founded Acuff-Rose Music, the first major Nashville-based country music publishing company, which signed such artists as Hank Williams, Roy Orbison, and the Everly Brothers. In 1962, Acuff became the first living inductee into the Country Music Hall of Fame.

Early life

Acuff was born on September 15, 1903 in Maynardville, Tennessee, to Ida Florence (née Carr) and Simon E. Neill Acuff, the third of their five children. Acuff is of Scottish ancestry, and his ancestors came to North America during the colonial era, settling in the mountains of Virginia and the Carolinas. The Acuffs were a fairly prominent family in Union County. Roy's paternal grandfather, Coram Acuff, had been a Tennessee state senator, and his maternal grandfather was a local physician. Roy's father was an accomplished fiddler and a Baptist preacher, his mother was proficient on the piano, and during Roy's early years the Acuff house was a popular place for local gatherings. At such gatherings, Roy would often amuse people by balancing farm tools on his chin. He also learned to play the harmonica and jaw harp at an early age.

In 1919, the Acuff family relocated to Fountain City (now a suburb of Knoxville), a few miles south of Maynardville. Roy attended Central High School, where he sang in the school chapel's choir and performed in "every play they had." His primary passion, however, was athletics. He was a three-sport standout at Central, and after graduating in 1925, was offered a scholarship to Carson-Newman University, but turned it down. He played with several small baseball clubs around Knoxville, worked at odd jobs, and occasionally boxed.

In 1929, Acuff tried out for the Knoxville Smokies, a minor-league baseball team then affiliated with the New York Giants. A series of collapses in spring training following a sunstroke, however, ended his baseball career. The effects left him ill for several years, and he suffered a nervous breakdown in 1930. "I couldn't stand any sunshine at all," he later recalled. While recovering, Acuff began to hone his fiddle skills, often playing on the family's front porch after the sun went down. His father gave him several records of regionally renowned fiddlers, such as Fiddlin' John Carson and Gid Tanner, which were important influences on his early style.

Career

Early music career
In 1932, Dr. Hauer's medicine show, which toured the southern Appalachian region, hired Acuff as one of its entertainers. Acuff began his career as a blackface performer. The purpose of the entertainers was to draw a large crowd to whom Hauer could sell patent medicines (of suspect quality) for various ailments. While on the medicine show circuit, Acuff met the legendary Appalachian banjoist Clarence Ashley, from whom he learned "The House of the Rising Sun" and "Greenback Dollar", both of which Acuff later recorded. As the medicine show lacked microphones, Acuff learned to sing loud enough to be heard above the din, a skill that later helped him stand out on early radio broadcasts.

In 1934, Acuff left the medicine show circuit and began playing at local shows with various musicians in the Knoxville area, where he had become a celebrity and fixture in local newspaper columns. That year,  guitarist Jess Easterday and Hawaiian guitarist Clell Summey joined Acuff to form the Tennessee Crackerjacks, who performed regularly on the Knoxville radio stations WROL and WNOX (the band moved back and forth between stations as Acuff bickered with their managers about compensation). Within a year, the group had added bassist Red Jones and changed its name to the Crazy Tennesseans after being introduced as such by a WROL announcer named Alan Stout. Fans often remarked to Acuff how "clear" his voice was coming through over the radio, important in an era when singers were often drowned out by string-band cacophony. The popularity of Acuff's rendering of the song "The Great Speckled Bird" helped the group land a contract with American Record Corporation, (ARC) for which they recorded several dozen tracks (including the band's best-known track, "Wabash Cannonball") in 1936. Needing to complete a 20-song commitment, the band recorded two ribald tunes—including "When Lulu's Gone"—but released them under a pseudonym, the Bang Boys. The group split from ARC in 1937 over a separate contract dispute.

Grand Ole Opry
In 1938, the Crazy Tennesseans moved to Nashville to audition for the Grand Ole Opry. Although their first audition went poorly, the band's second audition impressed Opry founder George D. Hay and producer Harry Stone, and they offered the group a contract later that year. On Hay and Stone's suggestion, Acuff changed the group's name to the Smoky Mountain Boys, referring to the mountains near where his bandmates and he grew up. Shortly after the band joined the Opry, Clell Summey left the group and was replaced by dobro player Beecher (Pete) Kirby—best known by his stage name Bashful Brother Oswald—whom Acuff had met in a Knoxville bakery earlier that year. Acuff's powerful lead vocals and Kirby's dobro playing and high-pitched backing vocals gave the band its distinctive sound. By 1939, Jess Easterday had switched to bass to replace Red Jones, and Acuff had added guitarist Lonnie "Pap" Wilson and banjoist Rachel Veach to fill out the band's lineup. Within a year, Roy Acuff and the Smoky Mountain Boys rivaled long-time Opry banjoist Uncle Dave Macon as the troupe's most popular act.
In the same period, he was initiated to the Masonic Lodge of East Nashville No. 560.

In spring 1940, Acuff and his band traveled to Hollywood, where they appeared with Hay and Macon in the motion picture Grand Ole Opry. Acuff appeared in several subsequent B movies, including O, My Darling Clementine (1943), in which he played a singing sheriff; Night Train to Memphis (1946), the title of which comes from a song Acuff recorded in 1940; and Home in San Antone (1949), in which he starred with Lloyd Corrigan and William Frawley.

Acuff and his band also joined Macon and other Opry acts at various tent shows held throughout the Southeast in the early 1940s. The crowds at these shows were so large that roads leading into the venues were jammed with traffic for miles. Starting in 1939, Acuff hosted the Opry's Prince Albert segment. He left the show in 1946 after a dispute with management.

Acuff-Rose
In 1942, Acuff and songwriter Fred Rose (1897–1954) formed Acuff-Rose Music. Acuff originally sought the company to publish his own music, but soon realized that demand from other country artists existed, many of whom had been exploited by larger publishing firms. Due in large part to Rose's ASCAP connections and gifted ability as a talent scout, Acuff-Rose quickly became the most important publishing company in country music. In 1946, the company signed Hank Williams, and in 1950, published their first major hit, Patti Page's rendition of "Tennessee Waltz".

Political ambitions
In 1943, Acuff was initiated into the East Nashville Freemasonic Lodge in Tennessee, of which he would remain a lifelong member. Later that same year, Acuff invited Tennessee Governor Prentice Cooper to be the guest of honor at a gala held to mark the nationwide premiere of the Opry's Prince Albert show. Cooper rejected the offer, however, and lambasted Acuff and his "disgraceful" music for making Tennessee the "hillbilly capital of the United States." A Nashville journalist reported the governor's comments to Acuff and suggested Acuff run for governor himself. While Acuff initially did not take the suggestion seriously, he did accept the Republican Party nomination for governor in 1948.

Acuff's nomination caused great concern for E. H. Crump, the head of a Memphis Democratic Party political machine that had dominated Tennessee state politics for nearly a quarter-century. Crump was not worried so much about losing the governor's office—in spite of Acuff's name recognition—but did worry that Acuff would draw large crowds to Republican rallies and bolster other statewide candidates. While Acuff did relatively well and helped reinvigorate Tennessee's Republicans, his opponent, Gordon Browning, still won with 67% of the vote.

Later career
After leaving the Opry, Acuff spent several years touring the Western United States, although demand for his appearances dwindled with the lack of national exposure and the rise of musicians such as Ernest Tubb and Eddy Arnold, who were more popular with younger audiences. He eventually returned to the Opry, although by the 1960s, his record sales had dropped off considerably. After nearly losing his life in an automobile accident outside of Sparta, Tennessee, in 1965, Acuff pondered retiring, making only token appearances on the Opry stage and similar shows, and occasionally performing duos with long-time bandmate Bashful Brother Oswald.

In 1972, Acuff's career received a brief resurgence in the folk-revival movement after he appeared on the Nitty Gritty Dirt Band album, Will the Circle Be Unbroken. The appearance paved the way for one of the defining moments of Acuff's career, which came on the night of March 16, 1974, when the Opry officially moved from the Ryman Auditorium to the Grand Ole Opry House at Opryland. The first show at the new venue opened with a huge projection of a late-1930s image of Roy Acuff and the Smoky Mountain Boys onto a large screen above the stage. A recording from one of the band's 1939 appearances was played over the sound system, with the iconic voice of George Hay introducing the band, followed by the band's performance of "Wabash Cannonball". That same night, Acuff showed President Richard Nixon, an honored guest at the event, how to yo-yo, and convinced the president to play several songs on the piano.

In the early 1980s, after the death of his wife, Mildred, Acuff, then in his 80s, moved into a small house on the Opryland grounds and continued performing daily on stage. He arrived early most days at the Opry before the shows and performed odd jobs, such as stocking soda in backstage refrigerators. He made a cameo appearance in the music video for Moe Bandy and Joe Stampley's 1984 parody hit song "Where's The Dress?" In 1988, he received the Golden Plate Award of the American Academy of Achievement. In 1991, he was awarded the National Medal of Arts, and given a lifetime achievement award by the John F. Kennedy Center for the Performing Arts, the first country music act to receive the esteemed honor.

Death

Roy Acuff died at the Baptist Hospital in Nashville on November 23, 1992, of congestive heart failure at the age of 89. He is buried in the Hillcrest section (grave 6, lot 9) of Spring Hill Cemetery on Gallatin Road in Nashville.

Repertoire and legacy

Many of Acuff's songs show a strong Christian influence, most notably "Great Speckled Bird", "The Prodigal Son", and "Lord, Build Me a Cabin". Such songs were typically set to a traditional Anglo-Celtic melody, which is most apparent on "Great Speckled Bird" and the 1940 recording "The Precious Jewel". Acuff performed popular songs of the day, including Pee Wee King's "Tennessee Waltz" and Dorsey Dixon's "I Didn't Hear Nobody Pray", the latter of which he appropriated and renamed "Wreck on the Highway". He also recorded a version of the Cajun fiddler Harry Choates's "Jole Blon". Traditional recordings included "Greenback Dollar", which he probably learned from Clarence Ashley while on the medicine-show circuit, and "Lonesome Old River Blues", which he recorded with the Smoky Mountain Boys in the 1940s. Acuff and the Crazy Tennesseans recorded "Wabash Cannonball"—another traditional song—in 1936, although Acuff did not provide the vocals on this early recording. The better-known version of the song with Acuff providing the vocals was recorded in 1947.

In 1979, Opryland opened the Roy Acuff Theatre, which was dedicated in Acuff's honor (it was demolished in 2011 after suffering extensive damage in the 2010 Tennessee floods). Dunbar Cave State Natural Area was established in 1973 from a recreational area the state had purchased from Mrs. McKay King. The cave was owned by Acuff from 1948 to 1963. Two museums have been named in Acuff's honor—the Roy Acuff Museum at Opryland (now closed) and the Roy Acuff Union Museum and Library in his hometown of Maynardville. Acuff has a star on the Hollywood Walk of Fame located at 1541 Vine Street. He is pictured with other country singers at the new Smoky Mountain Opera in Pigeon Forge, Tennessee.

Discography

Albums

Singles

Guest singles

References

External links
 Acuff-Ecoff Family Archives
 Biography at Who2
 Roy Acuff in the Country Music Hall of Fame
 
Roy Acuff at hillbilly–music.com
 

1903 births
1992 deaths
People from Maynardville, Tennessee
American country singer-songwriters
American Freemasons
American male singer-songwriters
American music industry executives
American people of Scottish descent
Blackface minstrel performers
Country Music Hall of Fame inductees
Country musicians from Tennessee
Grand Ole Opry members
Grammy Lifetime Achievement Award winners
Hickory Records artists
Kennedy Center honorees
United States National Medal of Arts recipients
Vocalion Records artists
Members of the Country Music Association
Music of East Tennessee
Musicians from Appalachia
Okeh Records artists
Columbia Records artists
Tennessee Republicans
Burials in Tennessee
20th-century American singers
20th-century American businesspeople
American country fiddlers
Singer-songwriters from Tennessee
20th-century American male singers
United Service Organizations entertainers